The World Group II was the second highest level of Fed Cup competition in 2008. Winning nations advanced to the World Group Play-offs, and the losing nations were demoted to the World Group II Play-offs.

Ukraine vs. Belgium

Japan vs. Croatia

Czech Republic vs. Slovakia

Argentina vs. Austria

References

See also
Fed Cup structure

World II